Lianzhou or Lian Prefecture was a zhou (prefecture) in imperial China in modern northwestern Guangdong, China. It existed (intermittently) from 590 to 1912. Between mid-600s and 621 it was known as Xiping Commandery, and between 742 and 758 as Lianshan Commandery.

Counties
Guiyang, modern Lianzhou
Yangshan, modern Yangshan County
Lianshan, modern Lianshan Zhuang and Yao Autonomous County

References

 
 
 

Prefectures of the Sui dynasty
Prefectures of the Tang dynasty
Prefectures of Southern Han
Guangnan East Circuit
Prefectures of the Yuan dynasty
Prefectures of the Ming dynasty
Former prefectures in Guangdong